Neuadd may refer to the following places in Wales:

Neuadd and Tylelo Mires, Site of Special Scientific Interest in Brecknock, Powys
Neuadd Idris, old market hall in Dolgellau, Gwynedd
Neuadd Trefawr, village in the community of Beulah, Ceredigion
Neuadd Wilym, village in the community of Llangoedmor, Ceredigion